The Mullaghmore Peninsula, also referred to as Mullaghmore Head, is a small peninsula in the north of County Sligo, Ireland. The coastal village of Mullaghmore is the peninsula's sole settlement. The village has 136 year-round residents according to the 2016 Census; however, its population is significantly higher during summer months. The peninsula is bounded by two large beaches on either side, and sports panoramic views of Ben Bulben and the Dartry Mountains, making it one of Sligo's most popular seaside destinations.

The skyline of Mullaghmore is dominated by Classiebawn Castle, which was designed by Dublin architect James R. Carroll for The 3rd Viscount Palmerston. However, the castle was not completed until 1874, long after Lord Palmerston's death. Following its completion, the fishing village of Mullach Gearr was demolished to make room for the castle's 3,000 acre estate. The last surviving evicted resident of Mullach Gearr, Freddy McHugh, died in the 1960s. A memorial to the "lost village" was unveiled along Mullaghmore Head in 2017. The castle was left empty from 1916 to 1950, when it came into the possession of the Mountbatten family. Louis Mountbatten spent his summers at Classiebawn until his death in August 1979, when his boat was blown up in Mullaghmore harbour by the Provisional IRA.

In recent years, Mullaghmore has become a big wave surfing destination that attracts surfers and windsurfers from around the world. Billabong hosted Ireland's first ever big-wave surf contest in Mullaghmore in 2011.

Places of interest

Bunduff Lough
Bunduff Strand (Mullaghmore Beach)
Classiebawn Castle
Kilkilloge Ringfort
Mullach Gearr Memorial
Mullaghmore Harbour
Mullaghmore Head sea cliffs
Mullaghmore Lobster Sea Farm
Mullaghmore Sailing Club
Offshore boat tours
Promontory forts
Trawalua Beach
The Watchtower

Gallery

See also
 Carbury, County Sligo
 Coastal landforms of Ireland

References

Geography of County Sligo
Landforms of County Sligo
History of County Sligo
Beaches of County Sligo
Surfing locations in Ireland
Mountbatten family
Special Areas of Conservation in the Republic of Ireland